The Great Silence may refer to:

Arts, entertainment, and media

Films

 The Great Silence (1968 film), an Italian-French Spaghetti Western directed and co-written by Sergio Corbucci

Literature
 The Great Silence (2018 book), a book by Milan M. Ćirković discussing possible explanations for Fermi Paradox.
 "The Great Silence", a 2015 novelette by Ted Chiang.

Science and technology

 The Great Silence a.k.a. Fermi Paradox named after Italian-American physicist Enrico Fermi - seemingly paradoxical absence of evidence for extraterrestrial intelligence